The 1992 European Athletics Indoor Championships were held in 1992 in Genoa, Italy. This was the first edition to be held biannually and not annually and also the first to be held over three days as opposed to two. It also marked the debut of the combined events at the championships.

Medal summary

Men

Women

Medal table

Participating nations

 (1)
 (4)
 (11)
 (5)
 (17)
 (3)
 (2)
 (18)
 (2)
 (1)
 (9)
 (30)
 (44)
 (30)
 (9)
 (9)
 (1)
 (5)
 (2)
 (49)
 (9)
 (7)
 (10)
 (9)
 (12)
 (10)
 (16)
 (3)
 (3)
 (25)
 (12)
 (16)
 (6)
 (43)
 (6)

See also
1992 in athletics (track and field)

External links
 Results - men at GBRathletics.com
 Results - women at GBRathletics.com
 The EAA

 
European Athletics Indoor Championships
E
International athletics competitions hosted by Italy
Sports competitions in Genoa
Athletics Indoor Championships
Athletics Indoor Championships
20th century in Genoa